Ismailpur (Harauli) is a village in Vaishali district of Bihar state in India.

Geography
Ismailpur village is located at 

Area of village (in hectares): 289 hectares

Economy 
 288 (household) are below the poverty line
The main source of income for the residents is farming. Here they cultivate mostly rice, watermelon, sunflower, banana, and mango.
Most of the young people have or are migrating to cities for their earnings.
 8% of the people are daily labourers.

Administrative profile 
 Administrative unit: Tirhut
 Division:
 District name: vaishali District (District Code 0516)
 Block name: Hajipur (Block Code 0516001)
 Panchayat name: Ismailpur (Panchayat Code 0516001003)
 Village name: Ismailpur (Village Code 01964900)

Population 
Number of households: 891
Total population: 6330
Male:  3367
Female: 2963
Below poverty line: 288 (Household)
Total working population: 37.19%
Working male population: 56.41%
Working women population: 15.07%
Marginal working population:10.6%
Non-working population: 62.81%

Literacy
Total literate people: 3501 (Total literacy rate 55.32)
Literate females: 1302 (Female literacy rate 43.94%)
Literate males: 2195 (Male literacy rate 65.21%).

Education

Two primary (government) schools are in the village. Other primary schools are Rajkiya Madhya Vidyalaya, Minapur Rai and Rajkiya Uchh Vidyalaya, Minapur Rai.

Colleges near Ismailpur 
Jamunilal College Hajipur (6.3 km from ismailpur )
RN College Hajipur (11 km from ismailpur )

Colleges and KIDS CARE near Ismailpur 

B.R.I.T.I Ismailpur
B.R.KIDS CARE Ismailpur

Temples

Budhi Mai Temple is one of the most famous temples in Vaishali district and also in Bihar.

Culture and cuisine 
People of Ismailpur celebrate the following festivals:
Makarsankranti
Vasant Panchami or Saraswati Puja
Maha Shivaratri
Holi
Ramanavami
Akshaya Tritiya or Akhateej
Buddha Purnima
Teej
Nag Panchami
Raksha-Bandhan
Krishna Janmashtami
Ananta Chaturthi
Vishwakarma Puja
Dasara
Dhanteras
Diwali or Deepavali
Chhat Puja
Kartik Poornima

Transportation

SH-74 BIHAR is a major state highway which links the village with Hajipur city, Lalganj town and Vaishali district

The village is 7 km from the Hajipur city, 19 km from the state capital of bihar patna and it is well connected with other major cities

Villagers can connect very easily to different cities or towns from Hajipur  using local transport, Buses.

Public transportation
There are very frequent vehicles flowing in and out of the village:

Regular Autos services 24×7 from the Hajipur and also morning and evening transport service available to the Lalganj Depot.
Available many other private vehicles (such as buses, mini taxis, etc.) run by individuals.
 Local buses schedulability is also available to village from the Muzaffarpur city to lalganj route.
Rail Way Station Hajipur Rail Way Station is the nearest railway station to the village.
sonpur railway Station near to Hajipur is also another option for villagers and visitors.

Notable places and locations 
Near places of village:

Nearby cities
Hajipur 7 km
Sonepur 12 km
Lalganj 13 km
Patna (capital of bihar ) 28 km

Nearby airports
Patna Airport 35 km near
Gaya Airport 133 km near

Nearby districts 
Vaishali District 23 km
Muzaffarpur district 59 km
Saran district 52 km

Railway station 
Fatehpur Harauli Railway Station 3 km
Hajipur Railway Station 7.4 km
Sonepur railway station 11 km
Parmanandpur Railway Station, (Saran) 19 km
Patna railway station 27 km

Nearest villages
 Samashak
Chandi 
Manua 
Astipur
Sri Rampur

Banking 
Dena bank

IFSC code: BKDN0911401.
MICR code: NA
State bank of India

IFSC Code: SBIN0009690.

References

Villages in Vaishali district
Hajipur
Articles containing video clips